The canton of Riez is an administrative division in southeastern France. At the French canton reorganisation which came into effect in March 2015, the canton was expanded from 9 to 26 communes:
 
Barrême
Beynes
Blieux
Bras-d'Asse
Le Castellet
Le Chaffaut-Saint-Jurson
Châteauredon
Chaudon-Norante
Clumanc
Entrevennes
Estoublon
Majastres
Mézel
Moustiers-Sainte-Marie
La Palud-sur-Verdon
Puimichel
Puimoisson 
Riez
Roumoules 
Saint-Jacques
Saint-Jeannet
Saint-Julien-d'Asse
Saint-Jurs
Saint-Lions
Senez
Tartonne

Demographics

See also
Cantons of the Alpes-de-Haute-Provence department 
Communes of France

References

Cantons of Alpes-de-Haute-Provence